Maryna Damantsevich (born 10 February 1984) is a Belarusian long distance runner who specialises in the marathon. She competed in the women's marathon event at the 2016 Summer Olympics. In 2018, she finished in 4th place in the women's marathon at the 2018 European Athletics Championships, held in Berlin, Germany.

References

External links
 

1984 births
Living people
Belarusian female long-distance runners
Belarusian female marathon runners
Place of birth missing (living people)
Athletes (track and field) at the 2016 Summer Olympics
Olympic athletes of Belarus